James Gillick (born 1972, Norfolk)  is an artist working in the figurative tradition. He works in his studio in Louth, Lincolnshire. He is known for painting still-life work alongside other subject matter including game paintings, portraits, horse paintings, as well as church re-ordering and gilding.

Life and work
Gillick gained a degree in Landscape Architecture from Cheltenham and Gloucester College in 1993. He is the son of Catholic activist Victoria Gillick and theatre set designer and former UKIP county councilor Gordon Gillick.

James Gillick has an identical twin, sculptor Theodore Gillick. He is a cousin to 2002 Turner Prize nominee Liam Gillick, and his great uncle and aunt were sculptor Ernest Gillick and medallist Mary Gillick.

Gillick is remarked as having an especial affection for the Flemish, Dutch and Spanish masters of the 17th century, particularly Velázquez and work in the Bodegón style. Using techniques of their era, Gillick claims to handcraft all the materials he uses within his studio; including oil paints, waxes, glues, varnishes, canvases and stretchers. He uses a limited palette of six colors plus black and white, having prepared the oils from ground pigments.

In 1998 he won a commission to paint Margaret Thatcher. The three-quarter length portrait was commissioned by the University of Buckingham to commemorate her six years as the chancellor of Britain's only private university. Thatcher is recorded as having been delighted with her portrait and supposedly commented, ‘Can I thank the artist for doing the impossible – a kind portrait of me in a way I would like to be remembered.’

In 2005, a portrait of Pope John Paul II commissioned by The Bishop of Nottingham, the Rt Rev. Malcolm McMahon, was completed. The portrait, as of 2009, hung in the Lady Chapel at St Barnabas' Cathedral in Nottingham, and an identical copy toured the country's parishes on request.

Gillick also completed various church restorations including at the churches of St Gregory and St Augustine in Summertown, Oxford. This work includes a new reredos where panels are painted featuring the patron saints St Augustine, St Gregory and the Virgin and child, plus a further ten panels in a type of iconostasis.

Exhibitions 
Gillick's work has been exhibited at Jonathan Cooper's Park Walk Gallery, London consistently since 2000 and has been included in several mixed exhibitions including; Royal Institute of Oil Painters, Mall Galleries and the Royal Society of Portrait Painters also at the Mall Galleries.

His work has also been exhibited at various art fairs including; Olympia Fine Art and Antiques Fair, BADA British Antiques and Fine Art Fair and the London Art Fair. He is often included in the annual RHS Chelsea Flower Show, the CLA Game Fair and the Burghley Horse Trials.

References

External links

James Gillick Official Website
Jonathan Cooper Park Walk Gallery
New Liturgical Movement article re: restoration work at SS Gregory & Augustine, Oxford January 20 2009
A short film of James Gillick at work in his studio spring 2009
St Austin Review article 'Painting Light' January/February 2009
transcript of ‘Silent Still Lifes that Speak’ Foreword from James Gillick’s 2007 Exhibition Catalogue by Gabriele Finaldi, Museo del Prado

1972 births
Living people
20th-century English painters
British identical twins
English male painters
21st-century English painters
21st-century English male artists
English contemporary artists
British still life painters
Catholic painters
People from Norfolk
20th-century English male artists